Leo Sonnyboy is a 1989 Swiss film directed by Rolf Lyssy. The comedy was filmed in Zürich and at various locations in Switzerland, and produced in Switzerland.

Plot (excerpt) 
Leo (Mathias Gnädinger) is about 40-year-old man who lives as a single in Zürich. He works as a train driver and is mothered by his Mama (Stefanie Glaser), but seems to be a bit solitary. His best friend Adrian (Christian Kohlund) has a serious problem with the Fremdenpolizei authorities, the immigration police of Switzerland, as his girlfriend Apia Kolong (Ankie Lau) from Thailand works as an exotic dancer, but Adrian is already married with children. Leo is persuaded by Adrian to marry Apia to allow her to continue living in Switzerland, Leo and Apia fall in love, and Apia wants to change her life, and so many problems and irritations really start.

Cast 
 Mathias Gnädinger : Leo Mangold
 Christian Kohlund : Adrian Hauser  
 Stephanie Glaser : Mama Mangold
 Ankie Lau : Apia Kolong
 Dieter Meier : Willi Zeier

Reception 
The Swiss comedy was one of the most successful films in the Swiss German cinemas between 1975 and 2004, and had an audience of 131,572 people. The comedy is distributed on DVD (RC 2). On 16 March 1991 the comedy started also at the New York New Directors/New Films Festival.

Soundtrack 
Dieter Meier of Yello played a demimonde businessmen, and so Yello also distributed the soundtrack.

References

External links 

1989 films
Swiss German-language films
Films shot in Switzerland
1989 comedy-drama films
Swiss comedy-drama films
Films about immigration
Films shot in Zürich
1989 comedy films
1989 drama films
1980s German-language films